György Majláth (April 2, 1786 – April 11, 1861), also known by his German name Georg von Majláth, was a Hungarian statesman.

Majláth was born in Zavar, Pozsony county, Kingdom of Hungary (today in Slovakia). He entered politics in his early 30s, and was appointed to a series of positions. In 1817 he became deputy head of Pozsony county; in 1819, second commissioner for Transylvania; in 1821 a member of the Governor's Council (Helytartótanács); and in 1822 prothonotary to the royal court. From 1832 to 1839 he worked as Staatsrat in Vienna, and in 1839 was appointed judge royal (országbíró) of Hungary. Around the time of the Hungarian Revolution of 1848, he became president of the upper house of the National Assembly in Pest, but resigned shortly thereafter. He died in 1861 in Vienna.

His son, also named György Majláth, was also active in Hungarian politics.

References
 

1786 births
1861 deaths
Hungarian jurists
Speakers of the House of Magnates
Judges royal
Chief justices of Hungary
19th-century Hungarian politicians